Margaret Smith or Maggie Smith may refer to:

People
Margaret Smith Court, known as Margaret Court (born 1942), Australian tennis player
Margaret A. Smith, superintendent of Volusia County Schools
Margaret Bayard Smith (1778–1844), American author
Margaret Charles Smith (1906–2004), African-American midwife
Margaret Chase Smith (1897–1995), United States Senator from Maine
Margaret Gladys Smith (1896–1970), American pathologist
Maggie Gordon-Smith, British track cyclist
Margaret Keiver Smith (1856–1934), American psychological and educational researcher
Margaret Mary Smith (1916–1986), ichthyologist, fish illustrator and academic
Maggie Rainey-Smith (born 1950), New Zealander writer
Margaret Smith (author) (1884–1970), wrote Muslim Women Mystics
Maggie Smith (born 1934), British actress
Margaret Smith (Scottish politician) (born 1961), Liberal Democrat Member of the Scottish Parliament for Edinburgh West
Margaret Smith (West Virginia politician) (born 1952), member of the West Virginia House of Delegates 
Maggie Smith (ceramist) (born 1950), American artist
Margaret Smith (poet) (born 1958), American poet and artist
Maggie Smith (poet) (born 1977), American writer 
Margaret Smith (bodybuilder) (born 1979), American professional female bodybuilder 
Margaret Smith (comedian), American standup comic, actress, writer and producer
Margaret Taylor (born Margaret Mackall Smith, 1788-1852), former first lady of the United States
Margaret Taylor Smith, American author and social activist
Margaret Smith, a character from Regular Show

Other uses
MV Margaret Smith, Empire ship originally named Empire Reaper

See also
Marguerite Smith (disambiguation)